Lewis Henry Berens ( – ), was a businessman, political theorist, lecturer and author in the early days of the colony of South Australia. He has frequently (and incorrectly) been referred to as Louis Behrens.

History
Berens was one of several sons of Henry Berens (c. 1821 – 21 June 1882) and Julia Berens, of Birmingham, England.

Berens was a partner in Berens Brothers, jewellers and importers of Montefiore Chambers, Waymouth Street, Adelaide then Stephens Place from 1878 to 1892, and a member of the consortium that founded the Adelaide Arcade in 1885.

He was involved with Ignatius Singer and Moritz Wolff Judell (c. 1846–1900) in producing the newspaper Our Commonwealth 1886–1888.
He was an active and enthusiastic single taxer and Free trader, involved in the Land Nationalization Society.
Around 1886 Berens, Singer, Henty Taylor, Max Lewin, and some others began in Adelaide the agitation for the taxation of land values as espoused by Henry George, who in 1890 visited Adelaide.
Singer and Behrens were instrumental in founding the Adelaide Democratic Club in 1887.

He was an unsuccessful candidate for the seat of Sturt in the South Australian House of Assembly in 1890.

He wrote The Story of My Dictatorship (1893) with Ignatius Singer. and Towards the Light

Mr. and Mrs. Berens left Adelaide for London around 1893.

Other interests
He was a competitive chess player.
After leaving for London he maintained a correspondence with A. T. Saunders.

Publications
 Singer's co-authorship mentioned once in ten citations. First edition, published anonymously by Bliss, Sands & Foster of London (1893) is now rare. A paperback facsimile has been produced by the University of California. The book is held as a standard tract by Henry George Societies. In 1911 a comedy based on the book was staged in Melbourne.
Berens, Lewis Henry Toward the light; elementary studies in ethics and economics,  London, S. Sonnenschein & co., 1903

Family
Berens married Rebecca Solomon, daughter of John Solomon JP (c. 1807 – 25 July 1889), on 4 September 1888. Their son Herbert Arthur Berens (17 May 1889 – ) was born in Adelaide and married Elsie Krause in London in 1921. John Solomon was a businessman of Alberto Terrace, Sydney, with no clear links to the Adelaide Solomon family.

Several Berens brothers, sons of Henry Berens (c. 1821 – 21 June 1882) and Julia Berens, of Birmingham, England, lived on Pulteney Street, Adelaide. The eldest, Bernard, died on 19 October 1880.

References 

1913 deaths
Jewellery retailers of Australia
Australian political philosophers